The women's 100 metres hurdles at the 2022 European Athletics Championships will take place at the Olympiastadion on 20 and 21 August.

Records

Schedule

Results

Round 1
First 3 in each heat (Q) and the next 3 fastest  (q) advanced to the semifinals.The 12 highest ranked athletes received a bye into the semifinals.

Semifinals
First 2 in each semifinal (Q) and the next 2 fastest (q) advanced to the Final.

Final

References

Hurdles 100 W
Sprint hurdles at the European Athletics Championships
Euro